Balisong (Folding Knife) is a 1955 Filipino film produced by Sampaguita Pictures. The film is in black and white.

Cast
Alicia Vergel as mother of Ace Vergel
Ramon Revilla as father of Jolo Revilla

External links
 

1956 films
Tagalog-language films
Sampaguita Pictures films
Philippine action films
1950s action films
Philippine black-and-white films